The 12437 / 12438 Secunderabad Rajdhani Express is a Superfast Express train from Indian Railways connecting Hyderabad, the state capital of Telangana and the national capital Delhi.

Traction
It is hauled by Lallaguda-based WAP-7 locomotive from end to end.

Schedule & Rakes
The train numbers are 12437/12438.
The train departs every Wednesday at 12:45 hrs from Secunderabad and arrives Hazrat Nizamuddin on Thursday at 10:40 hrs. While from Hazrat Nizamuddin it departs every Sunday at 15:35 hrs and arrives Secunderabad on Monday at 13:35 hrs. It comprises one AC 1st class, 5 AC 2 Tier, 9 AC 3 Tier and 1 pantry car. This train runs with LHB rakes. It shares its rake with Chennai Rajdhani Express and Thiruvananthapuram Rajdhani Express and Madgaon Rajdhani Express

Time Table

Coaches

Transport in Secunderabad
Transport in Delhi
Rajdhani Express trains
Rail transport in Telangana
Rail transport in Madhya Pradesh
Rail transport in Maharashtra
Rail transport in Uttar Pradesh
Rail transport in Delhi
Railway services introduced in 2002